Élaine Zakaïb (July 9, 1959 – October 1, 2018) was a Canadian politician. She was member of the National Assembly of Quebec for the riding of Richelieu, first elected in the 2012 election and re-elected in 2014.

Zakaïb was Minister Delegate for Industrial Policy and the Quebec Economic Development Bank in the government of Pauline Marois.

Born in Sorel-Tracy, Quebec on July 9, 1959, Zakaïb was an associate at Feldman & Associés from 1984 to 1992, and a lawyer for the Jacob clothing retailer in 1987.

On September 29, 2014, she resigned her seat to return to the Jacob women's clothing retailer as chief of restructuring and vice-president of strategy.

Zakaïb died on October 1, 2018 of brain cancer.

References

1959 births
2018 deaths
Canadian people of Lebanese descent
Deaths from brain cancer in Canada
Women government ministers of Canada
Members of the Executive Council of Quebec
Parti Québécois MNAs
People from Sorel-Tracy
Women MNAs in Quebec
21st-century Canadian politicians
21st-century Canadian women politicians
Université Laval alumni